Reegan O'Gorman (born 7 May 1996) is a Canadian rugby union player, currently playing for the New England Free Jacks in Major League Rugby (MLR) and the Canadian national side. His preferred position is lock. He previously played for the Austin Gilgronis in MLR.

Professional career
O'Gorman signed for Major League Rugby side Austin Gilgronis ahead of the 2021 Major League Rugby season. He had previously signed for the Toronto Arrows for the 2020 Major League Rugby season, however the move was cancelled due to the COVID-19 pandemic. He made his debut for Canada in the 2017 Americas Rugby Championship, appearing in five matches.

Career statistics

References

External links
itsrugby.co.uk Profile

1996 births
Living people
Canadian rugby union players
Canada international rugby union players
Rugby union locks
Austin Gilgronis players
New England Free Jacks players